"Bothered and Bewildered" is an episode of the BBC sitcom, The Green Green Grass. It was first screened on 29 September 2006, as the third episode of series two.

Synopsis

In this classic episode of series two of the much loved spin off, Boycie decides that it's time to sack one of his staff members as they are not doing enough work. So, it's Mrs Cakeworthy that is for the chop. As soon as Mrs Cakeworthy leaves, strange things start to happen around Winterdown Farm – and Elgin, Byran and Jed seem to believe that these strange goings-on have something to do with the curse that Mrs Cakeworthy put on Farmer Boyce, as she is apparently a witch. In the end it is Marlene who has been scaring Boycie – in an attempt to get Mrs Cakeworthy her job back. A classic quote in this episode from Boycie: Yes, but you seem to be forgetting that I haven't got a cock. In fact I haven't got any poultry whatsoever...

References

British TV Comedy Guide for The Green Green Grass
BARB viewing figures

2006 British television episodes
The Green Green Grass episodes